Jutta Appelt (born 17 September 1939) is a German politician and writer from the German Christian Democratic Union. She was a member of the Landtag of North Rhine-Westphalia between 1995 and 2005.

References

1939 births
Living people
Politicians from Bavaria
Members of the Landtag of North Rhine-Westphalia
Christian Democratic Union of Germany politicians
People from Roth (district)